"Nun komm, der Heiden Heiland" is a Lutheran hymn for Advent by Martin Luther, the translation of a Latin hymn.

Based on this hymn, the following musical pieces bear the same title:
 Nun komm, der Heiden Heiland, BWV 61, a 1714 cantata by Johann Sebastian Bach
 Nun komm, der Heiden Heiland, BWV 62, a 1724 cantata by Bach
 Nun komm, der Heiden Heiland (Böhm), a cantata by Georg Böhm
 Nun komm, der Heiden Heiland, BWV 599, a chorale prelude by Bach, included in the Orgelbüchlein
 Nun komm, der Heiden Heiland, BWV 659, a chorale prelude by Bach, included in Great Eighteen Chorale Preludes
 "Nun komm' der Heiden Heiland",  No. 3, piano transcription by Ferruccio Busoni of BWV 659
 Nun komm, der Heiden Heiland, BWV 660, a chorale prelude by Bach, included in the Great Eighteen Chorale Preludes
 Nun komm, der Heiden Heiland, BWV 661, a chorale prelude by Bach, included in the Great Eighteen Chorale Preludes
 Nun komm, der Heiden Heiland, BWV 699, a chorale prelude by Bach, No. 10 of the Kirnberger Collection
 "Nun komm, der Heiden Heiland", a movement of Bach's cantata Schwingt freudig euch empor, BWV 36
 Nun komm, der Heiden Heiland, a 2004 composition by George C. Baker
 Nun komm, der Heiden Heiland, a chorale prelude by Nicolaus Bruhns
 Nun komm, der Heiden Heiland, a chorale prelude by Nicolaus Vetter
 Nun komm, der Heiden Heiland, an album by amarcord

See also
"Prelude" from "Nun komm der Heiden Heiland" (II),  a 1963 track by the Swingle Singers from Back to Bach